Clotton Hoofield is a civil parish in Cheshire West and Chester, England.  It contains 17 buildings that are recorded in the National Heritage List for England as designated listed buildings, all of which are at Grade II.  This grade is the lowest of the three gradings given to listed buildings and is applied to "buildings of national importance and special interest".  The parish contains the small settlements of Clotton and Hoofield, but is otherwise rural.  The listed buildings are all either domestic or related to farming.  They fall into two time-groups; those originating in the 16–17th centuries, and those from the 19th century.  All the buildings originating before the later part of the 17th century are timber-framed, or have timber-framed cores; The later buildings are in brick.

See also
Listed buildings in Willington
Listed buildings in Utkinton and Cotebrook
Listed buildings in Tarporley
Listed buildings in Tiverton
Listed buildings in Tilstone Fearnall
Listed buildings in Huxley
Listed buildings in Duddon
Listed buildings in Burton

References

Listed buildings in Cheshire West and Chester
Lists of listed buildings in Cheshire